Willie Paul Bloomquist (born November 27, 1977) is an American baseball coach and former utility player, who is the current head baseball coach of the Arizona State Sun Devils. He played college baseball at Arizona State for coach Pat Murphy from 1997 to 1999 and played in Major League Baseball (MLB) for 14 seasons from 2002 to 2015. In 2021, he returned to his alma mater, Arizona State.

The Seattle Mariners selected Bloomquist in the third round of the 1999 MLB draft. He played 14 years primarily an outfielder and shortstop, with Seattle from 2002 to 2008, the Kansas City Royals from 2009 to 2010, the Cincinnati Reds in 2010, the Arizona Diamondbacks from 2011 to 2013 before returning to Seattle from 2014 to 2015.

Early baseball career

High school
Bloomquist was All-State and all-league MVP in baseball  at South Kitsap High School in Port Orchard, Washington and was an eighth round pick in 1996 MLB draft. He was a high school teammate with former MLB player Jason Ellison. He also played quarterback for South Kitsap. In his junior season, the team won the state AAA football championship

College
He chose to accept a scholarship to Arizona State University. In 1998, Bloomquist tied a College World Series single-game record with five  hits in a  game with Long Beach State. He was honored as Pac-10 Player of the Year in 1999 and was named first-team All-American by Baseball America. He finished his college career with a .394 (256/649) average over three seasons and was named ASU On Deck Circle Most Valuable Player.

Professional career

Seattle Mariners

Bloomquist was drafted out of South Kitsap High School in Port Orchard, Washington by the Seattle Mariners in the eighth round (237th overall) of the 1996 MLB draft, but was not signed. 
He was drafted again by the Mariners out of Arizona State University in the third round (95th overall) of the 1999 MLB draft and signed.

The Mariners signed Bloomquist to a contract extension through the  season worth $1,875,000, in 2006. On June 15, he hit an inside-the-park home run in Minute Maid Park. On June 26, 2007, Bloomquist hit a lead-off home run in the second inning—on what was his 1,000th career at-bat.

Kansas City Royals
On January 9, 2009, Bloomquist signed a two-year deal with the Kansas City Royals. He played in 197 games with the Royals over parts of 2 seasons, hitting .265.

Cincinnati Reds
On September 13, 2010, Bloomquist was traded to the Cincinnati Reds for a player to be named later, or cash. In 11 games with the Reds, he hit .333.

Arizona Diamondbacks
On January 18, 2011, Bloomquist signed a one-year contract with the Arizona Diamondbacks. He hit .266 in 97 games with the Diamondbacks in 2011 and re-signed with the team after the season.

Second stint with Mariners
On December 5, 2013, Bloomquist signed a two-year deal to return to the Seattle Mariners. On July 2, 2015, Bloomquist was designated for assignment, and shortstop Chris Taylor called up from the Triple-A Tacoma Rainiers to take his roster spot.

On March 11, 2016, Bloomquist announced his retirement on Twitter.

Coaching career
On June 11, 2021, Bloomquist was named the new head coach of the Arizona State Sun Devils baseball team.

Head coaching record

Personal life
Bloomquist is married and has four daughters, Natalie, Ava, Layla and Sydney.  He is Roman Catholic.

References

External links

Baseball Prospectus (statistics)

1977 births
Living people
All-American college baseball players
American people of Swedish descent
Arizona Diamondbacks players
Arizona League Diamondbacks players
Arizona State Sun Devils baseball coaches
Arizona State Sun Devils baseball players
Baseball players from Washington (state)
Catholics from Washington (state)
Cincinnati Reds players
Everett AquaSox players
Kansas City Royals players
Lancaster JetHawks players
Major League Baseball infielders
Major League Baseball outfielders
People from Bremerton, Washington
Reno Aces players
San Antonio Missions players
Seattle Mariners players
Tacoma Rainiers players
World Baseball Classic players of the United States
2013 World Baseball Classic players